Tsegaye Mamo is an Ethiopian politician who has been serving as Prosperity Party of South West Ethiopia Peoples' Region 2021.

Mamo served in the House of Federation in 2011.

References

Ethiopian politicians
Living people
Year of birth missing (living people)